For parsing algorithms in computer science, the inside–outside algorithm is a way of re-estimating production probabilities in a probabilistic context-free grammar. It was introduced by James K. Baker in 1979 as a generalization of the forward–backward algorithm for parameter estimation on hidden Markov models to stochastic context-free grammars. It is used to compute expectations, for example as part of the expectation–maximization algorithm (an unsupervised learning algorithm).

Inside and outside probabilities
The inside probability  is the total probability of generating words , given the root nonterminal  and a grammar :

The outside probability  is the total probability of beginning with the start symbol  and generating the nonterminal  and all the words outside , given a grammar :

Computing inside probabilities
Base Case:

General case:

The inside probability  is just the sum over all such possible rules:

Computing outside probabilities
Base Case:

General case:

Suppose there is a rule  in the grammar that generates .
Then the left contribution of that rule to the outside probability  is:

Now suppose there is a rule  in the grammar. Then the right
contribution of that rule to the outside probability  is:

The outside probability  is the sum of the left and right
contributions over all such rules:

References

 J. Baker (1979): Trainable grammars for speech recognition. In J. J. Wolf and D. H. Klatt, editors, Speech communication papers presented at the 97th meeting of the Acoustical Society of America, pages 547–550, Cambridge, MA, June 1979. MIT.
 Karim Lari, Steve J. Young (1990): The estimation of stochastic context-free grammars using the inside–outside algorithm. Computer Speech and Language, 4:35–56.
 Karim Lari, Steve J. Young (1991): Applications of stochastic context-free grammars using the Inside–Outside algorithm. Computer Speech and Language, 5:237–257.
 Fernando Pereira, Yves Schabes (1992): Inside–outside reestimation from partially bracketed corpora. Proceedings of the 30th annual meeting on Association for Computational Linguistics, Association for Computational Linguistics, 128–135.

External links
 Inside-outside algorithm - Fei Xia
 The Inside-Outside Algorithm - Michael Collins

Parsing algorithms